Charles Inglis Thornton (20 March 1850 – 10 December 1929), nicknamed "Buns", was an English cricketer who played more than 200 first-class matches in the later 19th century, for no fewer than 22 different teams.
He was also the founder of the Scarborough Festival.

Thornton was born in Llanwarne, Herefordshire, the son of the Rural Dean of Hereford. He was orphaned before the age of five. and adopted, along with his brother, by Archdeacon Harrison of Canterbury. This is where he began to play cricket playing with children in the neighbourhood in informal single wicket competitions. He played his first organised game at Great Mongeham in 1861 making 22 not out.

He was educated at Eton and Trinity College, Cambridge.
His career at Eton was slow to win approval. The master in charge of cricket, Fred Bell, did not like his attacking play. Thornton remarked that it was because he hit all the best balls into the trees. He had success in both Eton v Harrow and Oxford v Cambridge matches, then very much part of the London season. He must have had independent means because on graduation he was able to rent a hunting box in Oxford with his cousin, hunting three days a week and playing cricket the other four.

He was considered one of the biggest hitters in cricket, with one shot at Hove in 1876 claimed to have exceeded 160 yards.
He hit the ball over the pavilion at Lord's in the 1868 Eton v Harrow match. This, however was over the old pavilion. The only person to have struck a ball over the current pavilion (built 1889–90) is AE Trott. Other claims made by Thornton included a 156-yard hit at Ranelagh, a 152-yard hit at Canterbury and a 136-yard hit at Scarborough, the ball landing in Trafalgar Square (Scarborough).

Thornton founded the Orleans Club which was active for ten years from 1878. His own private team — C. I. Thornton's XI — played most of their early games at Fenner's, but after his retirement from playing in 1897 their home became Scarborough, where they continued to play first-class cricket until 1929, the year of Thornton's death. He died aged 79 in Marylebone, London.

Thornton had some interesting ideas about cricket. He wanted bowlers’ run ups limited to 10 yards, and the wearing of leg guards (pads) to be forbidden. The only protection he advocated was football style shin pads.

References

Bibliography

External links

1850 births
1929 deaths
People educated at Eton College
Alumni of Trinity College, Cambridge
English cricketers
Kent cricketers
Middlesex cricketers
Cambridge University cricketers
Marylebone Cricket Club cricketers
Sportspeople from Herefordshire
Gentlemen of the South cricketers
North v South cricketers
Orleans Club cricketers
North of the Thames v South of the Thames cricketers
Gentlemen cricketers
Gentlemen of England cricketers
C. I. Thornton's XI cricketers
A. J. Webbe's XI cricketers
Lyric Club cricketers
Lord Londesborough's XI cricketers
Gentlemen of Kent cricketers